Arnaia, is a town and a former municipality in Chalkidiki, Greece. Since the 2011 local government reform it is part of the municipality Aristotelis, of which it is a municipal unit. The municipal unit has an area of 288.739 km2. Population 6,063 (2011). The History and Folklore Museum of Arnaia is located in the town.

Subdivisions
Subdivisions of the municipal unit (population in 2011 between square brackets):

Arnaia [ 2,300 ] 
Varvara [ 631 ] 
Neochori [ 714 ]
Palaiochori [ 1,489 ]
Stanos [ 929 ]

References

External links

Populated places in Chalkidiki